Isaiah Collier is an American basketball player who currently attends Wheeler High School.

Early life and high school
Collier grew up in Marietta, Georgia and attends Wheeler High School. His coach at Wheeler is his uncle, Larry Thompson. Collier averaged 18 points, seven rebounds, seven assists, and two steals per game as a junior. He played in the Nike Elite Youth Basketball League (EYBL) following the season and averaged 17.6 points, 5.1 rebounds, and 6.5 assists per game. Collier suffered a meniscus injury in his knee while participating in workouts with the United States under-18 basketball team in May 2022, which caused him to miss the rest of the EYBL circuit. He participated in the Curry Camp and was named the camp's MVP. Collier was selected to play in the 2023 McDonald's All-American Boys Game during his senior year. He was also selected to play for Team USA in the Nike Hoops Summit. Collier won the 2023 Naismith Prep Player of the Year Award.

Recruiting
Collier is a consensus five-star recruit and one of the top players in the 2023 class, according to major recruiting services. He is rated as the number one overall prospect for the 2023 class by 247Sports.com. Collier committed to play college basketball at USC after considering offers from Cincinnati, Michigan, and UCLA.

References

External links
USA Basketball bio

Living people
American men's basketball players
Basketball players from Georgia (U.S. state)
Point guards
Year of birth missing (living people)